Gregory Mark Barton (born December 2, 1959 in Jackson, Michigan) is an American sprint kayaker who competed from the mid-1980s to the early 1990s.

During his career he won four Olympic medals, including two gold medals, and four world championship titles.

Career
Competing in three Summer Olympics, Barton won four medals with two golds (K-1 1000 m, K-2 1000 m: both 1988) and two bronzes (1984, 1992: both in K-1 1000 m).

Barton also won six medals at the ICF Canoe Sprint World Championships with four golds (K-1 1000 m: 1987, K-1 10000 m: 1985, 1987, 1991), a silver (K-1 10000 m: 1990), and a bronze (K-1 1000 m: 1991).

He received a BSE degree in mechanical engineering in 1983 from the University of Michigan, where he was a member of the Chi Phi Fraternity.  He lives in Seattle, WA with his wife, the former Justine Smith, and their two daughters.

The Greg Barton Cup Challenge for the United States Canoe Association is named in his honor. Shortly before he competed in the Olympics, Barton moved to Homer, Michigan. The traffic circle downtown was named in his honor after he won his gold medals. His brother, Bruce, competed in canoeing for the United States at the 1976 Summer Olympics in Montreal.

Barton currently co-owns and operates Epic Kayaks, which makes high-end kayaks, surfskis, and paddles.
His daughters are Hayley and Kendall.

Greg and Kevin Olney won the first SEVENTY48 human powered race in an Epic Surf Ski averaging about 7 mph for the 70 miles from Tacoma, WA to Port Townsend, WA on June 11–12, 2018.

References

Further reading

External links

 "Greg Barton", Epic Kayaks.
 "The Barton Mold", Epic Kayaks.
 
 

1959 births
American male canoeists
Canoeists at the 1984 Summer Olympics
Canoeists at the 1988 Summer Olympics
Canoeists at the 1992 Summer Olympics
Living people
Olympic gold medalists for the United States in canoeing
Olympic bronze medalists for the United States in canoeing
Sportspeople from Jackson, Michigan
University of Michigan College of Engineering alumni
American mechanical engineers
ICF Canoe Sprint World Championships medalists in kayak
Medalists at the 1992 Summer Olympics
Medalists at the 1988 Summer Olympics
Medalists at the 1984 Summer Olympics
Pan American Games gold medalists for the United States
Pan American Games medalists in canoeing
Canoeists at the 1987 Pan American Games
Medalists at the 1987 Pan American Games